The 2006 UCI Mountain Bike World Cup included four disciplines: marathon, cross-country, downhill and 4-cross.

Cross-country

Downhill

Marathon

Four-cross

See also
2006 UCI Mountain Bike & Trials World Championships

UCI Mountain Bike World Cup
Mountain Bike World Cup